Joan Maureen "Biddy" Baxter, MBE (born 25 May 1933) is a British television producer, best known for editing the long-running BBC TV children's magazine show Blue Peter from 1965 to 1988. As editor of the programme, Baxter devised much of the format that is still used today.

Biography

Early life 
Baxter was born on 25May 1933 at Regent Hospital, Leicester, Leicestershire, to Bryan Reginald Baxter and Dorothy Vera, . Her father was a teacher, who later became the director of a sportswear company, and her mother was a pianist. She was educated at Wyggeston Girls' Grammar School, Leicester and St Mary's, a women's college at Durham University, which she attended from 1952 to 1955. 

In Patrick Dickinson's book Could Do Better, Baxter described one school report as saying, "Biddy has worked very well during the term and her year's work has been very satisfactory. She shows interest in all that she does and she is a very cheery little girl with very pleasant manners."

At a meeting with the careers officer at her university, Baxter noticed information about working for the BBC. "It wasn't that I was being snotty about secretarial work or teaching, I just didn't want to do either of them," she said in 2013 of the options offered to her on this occasion. "This particular teaching officer seemed to me – though maybe I was being unduly sensitive – to have this blind spot about women. All the men were going off to do these amazing things. I really should be grateful to him".

After graduating with a social sciences degree, Baxter joined the BBC as a studio manager in 1955, becoming a producer of schools' English programmes in 1958, and of Listen with Mother in 1961. After moving to a temporary post in 1962 within BBC Television owing to a staff shortage, she gained a permanent post as producer of Blue Peter from November 1962, and remained directly responsible for the programme for just over a quarter of a century.

Blue Peter 
First broadcast on 16 October 1958, Blue Peter had originally been devised by John Hunter Blair, but it was Baxter and her deputy Edward Barnes, later head of BBC children's television, who developed the format into a successful programme, initially on a budget of only £180 per edition. When they were first introduced, Barnes was told: "You'll have to look after Biddy – she doesn't know very much", to his considerable irritation.

Baxter devised and introduced the Blue Peter badge in 1963 to encourage children to send in programme ideas, pictures, letters and stories and also she introduced the now famous annual appeals. She was awarded a gold badge herself when she retired as editor from the programme.  Having been disappointed as a child to receive the same reply twice to different letters that she had written to Enid Blyton, she also introduced a card index system so that Blue Peter viewers could receive more personal responses. Baxter became programme editor in April 1965 following a reorganisation, while Barnes and Rosemary Gill became producers when the programme began to be broadcast twice a week in 1964.

Baxter was a divisive figure for some ex-presenters. Valerie Singleton has said Baxter treated the presenters like children. However, Peter Purves has also said: "the programme succeeded – and I've said this many times – because of her, not in spite of her. She absolutely ruled it; I didn't always agree with her views, but she was right."

Post-Blue Peter life
Her final programme in the role of editor aired on 27 June 1988. Her husband, John Hosier, who had been a BBC Schools music producer and was a music educator, had accepted a job offer in Hong Kong. After returning from Hong Kong in 1993, Baxter continued to work for the BBC, as a consultant to directors-general Michael Checkland and John Birt. Hosier died in 2000.

In the 1981 New Year Honours, Baxter was honoured with an MBE (Member of the Civil Division of the Order of the British Empire), in recognition of her work as editor of Blue Peter; she received her MBE from The Queen at Buckingham Palace, on 10 February 1981. She is also a fellow of the Royal Television Society, and has received honorary D. Litts from the University of Newcastle in 1988 and the University of Durham in 2012.

In September 2008, Baxter expressed dissatisfaction with the way Blue Peter was being run and said that she believed that the BBC was trying to close the programme down.

In November 2013, Baxter was announced as the recipient of the Special Award at the BAFTA Children's Awards in 2013. Baxter was praised by Anna Home, former head of BBC Children's Television, on receiving the award. Home told Jane Martinson of The Guardian in 2013: "Somehow she was overlooked. If anyone deserves to be recognised she does … Blue Peter is a legend and she is Blue Peter".

In June 2014, Baxter was the guest on BBC Radio 4's Desert Island Discs. Her choices were "Deo Gracias" from A Ceremony of Carols by Benjamin Britten, the final chorus from the St Matthew Passion by Johann Sebastian Bach, "Milord" by Édith Piaf, "Beat Out Dat Rhythm on a Drum" from the musical Carmen Jones, the "Andante quasi lento e cantabile" from the Carol Symphony by Victor Hely-Hutchinson, the Allegro from the String Quintet in C Major by Franz Schubert, the Allegro from the Concierto de Aranjuez by Joaquín Rodrigo and the "Papageno Duet" from The Magic Flute by Wolfgang Amadeus Mozart. Her book choice was The Traveller's Tree by Patrick Leigh Fermor.

Further reading

References

Notes

Sources 
 
 The Mark Lawson Interview, repeatedly broadcast on BBC 4 throughout May 2007 as part of the 'Children's Television' season.
 

1933 births
Living people
Alumni of St Mary's College, Durham
Blue Peter
English television producers
Members of the Order of the British Empire
People from Leicester
BBC television producers